Gnamptogyia is a genus of moths of the family Erebidae. The genus was erected by George Hampson in 1894.

Species
Based on Afromoths and The Global Lepidoptera Names Index:
Gnamptogyia diagonalis Hampson, 1910 (from Kenya and Zambia)
Gnamptogyia multilineata Hampson, 1894
Gnamptogyia strigalis Strand, 1912 (from Tanzania)

References

Calpinae
Moth genera